The African Institute for Future Studies, also known as Panafrican Institute for Future Studies or INADEP, is a research institution and university founded in 1989 by the President of Zaire (present day Democratic Republic of the Congo) (Ordinance 89–287 of 9 November 1989). It is located in Kinshasa, Congo, though it was originally located in Zomba, Malawi. In addition to subsidiary departments that are funded for the future studies or for the exploration of the future, INADEP has funded a Centre for the exploration of the past, named Diop's Center for Egyptology. INADEP is a member of the National Research Council of Congo and one of the National Government Organizations devoted exclusively to scientific research and to the training of new researchers.

Origin
In 1976, the United Nations, through its Economic Commission for Africa (EGA) launched the idea of founding an African Institute for Studies of the Future. In 1977, the IXth Conference for ECA ministers defined the objectives of the institute. In 1980, Professor Mahdi Elmandjra conducted a feasibility study entitled Report on the Desirability and Feasibility of Establishing an African Institute for Advanced public Policy Analysis and Future Studies. In 1981, the OAU summit held in Nairobi approved the idea of founding an Institute for decolonising the future. In 1982, the Conference for EGA Ministers approved the idea of establishing the institute. In 1987 the book Reconquering the Future was published at the request of UNDP.

Foundation
In  1985, the International Symposium on Africa and its Future thinks it is appropriate to start an African Centre for Studies of the Future. President Mobutu Sese Seko agrees to the idea and offers to provide initial infrastructural facilities in Kinshasa.

Ordinance 89–287 of 9 November 1989 prescribed the foundation of a public institution called Institut Africain d'Etudes Prospectives (INADEP), and in 1990 the Center for Egyptology was added. The chairman of the Centre for Egyptology is Mubabinge Bilolo.

Objectives
The institute is an Africa-oriented study centre and, as such, pursues the following main objectives:
Provide institutional facilities for long-term research on international, political, cultural, economic, sociological, and technical modifications to the African or world situation in the present or in the future
assess strategies, indicate the various options available, and offer a just and balanced picture of the future as well as propose directives for a planned realisation of the objectives proposed

Support
The INADEP receives support and encouragement from international institutions such as UNDP, OAU, EGA, UNESCO, UNICEF, ABDA, ABD, EEC, and the World Bank. It also receives support from specialised centres in France, Great Britain, Germany, the United States, Scandinavian Countries, Japan, and the Soviet Union.

Programme

Immediate actions
The programme includes a campaign for the cohesion of African countries and for obtaining of assistance expected from international organisations.

Departments of the institute
Documentation and basic equipment department
Centre for computerised data
Research units

Activities
General concepts and methods of future studies
Analysis and definition of Main Directions of development
Bibliologie or graphic communication
Training by means of conferences, retraining and in-service sessions, short courses, and other means
Organisation of colloquia and symposia
Studies for the prevention of social deviance
Publication of Editions Universitaires Africaines /EDUAF

References

External links
 INADEP
 Membership
 Association International Association of Egyptologists
 CCER List of Egyptologists
 Revue de l'INADEP

Education in Kinshasa
Universities in the Democratic Republic of the Congo